Mandaikadu is a panchayat town in Kanniyakumari district in the Indian state of Tamil Nadu.

References

Cities and towns in Kanyakumari district